Briljant, Hard en Geslepen is an album by the Dutch death metal band Nembrionic who wrote and recorded all the music, and the Dutch hip hop band Osdorp Posse who contributed the lyrics and vocals.

Track listing
 "Briljant, hard en geslepen" –  (Brilliant, hard and cunning) 1:57 
 "Wat ik effe kwijt wou" –  (What I wanted to say) 03:22 
 "De schijnheil Hitlers" –  (The hypocrite Hitlers) 03:50 
 "Adrenaline" –  (Adrenalin) 01:41 
 "Zondebokken" –  (Scapegoats) 04:07 
 "Krab- en roershit" –  (Scratch and mix shit) 00:25 
 "Over en uit" –  (Over and out) 05:48 
 "In je smoel!" –  (In your face!) 01:22 
 "Een stevige beurt" –  (A thorough job) 03:13 
 "Mislukkig zijn" –  (Being unhappy/failure) 03:36 
 "Marie Johanna" –  (Mary Jane) 04:59 
 "Voor de fans" –  (For the fans) 03:01 
 "Machteloos" –  (Powerless) 05:18 
 "Commerciële AIDS nog steeds!" –  (Still commercial AIDS!) 02:36 
 "Nepsupporters" –  (Fake supporters) 03:33 
 "Je kan ons niet..." –  (You can't ... us) 01:43 
 "Boodschap aan de wereld?" –  (Message to the world?) 03:39 
 "Stalen Heupoperatie" –  (Steel hipsurgery) 01:29

References 

1996 albums
Nembrionic albums
Osdorp Posse albums